Liberato Damião Ribeiro Pinto ComTE, ComC, ComA, ComSE, (Lisbon, 29 September 1880 – Lisbon, 4 August 1949) was a Portuguese Lieutenant Colonel of the Republican National Guard (Guarda Nacional Republicana, GNR), politician and President of the Ministry (Prime Minister) of one of the governments of the Portuguese First Republic. He was the Portuguese head of government for a short time from 1920 to 1921 and the 44th Minister of Finance of Portugal from 22 February 1921 until 2 March 1921.

He married Maria Augusta Supico and had a son Minister Clotário Luís Supico Ribeiro Pinto (1909-1986), 937th Associate of the Second Tauromachic Club, married on 4 April 1945 to Cecília Maria de Castro Pereira de Carvalho (born Lisbon, Mártires, 30 May 1921), of the Viscounts (formerly Barons) of Chanceleiros, who became celebrated for her radio support to the troops of the Portuguese Colonial War, without issue, and had a natural daughter by actress Maria Adelaide da Silva Lalande (Castelo Branco, Salgueiro do Campo, 7 November 1913 - Lisbon, 21 March 1968), wife of actor Ribeirinho.

References 

1880 births
1949 deaths
People from Lisbon
Prime Ministers of Portugal
Naval ministers of Portugal
Democratic Party (Portugal) politicians
Finance ministers of Portugal

Recipients of the Order of the Tower and Sword
Commanders of the Order of Christ (Portugal)
Commanders of the Order of Aviz
Commanders of the Order of Saint James of the Sword